Albert Charles Saunders (October 12, 1874 – October 18, 1943) was a Canadian politician and jurist from Prince Edward Island.

Saunders served as mayor of Summerside for four terms. He was first elected to the provincial legislature in 1919 and  became leader of the opposition Liberal Party in 1923.

He led the Liberals to victory in the 1927 election by supporting the continuation of total prohibition against the  Conservative government's proposals to ease the temperance measure.  The Saunders government revised the curriculum of the public school system, raised the salaries of teachers and improved the island's roads.

He served as the 16th premier of Prince Edward Island until 1930 when he accepted an appointment to the provincial Supreme Court. Saunders died in Summerside.

1874 births
1943 deaths
Mayors of Summerside, Prince Edward Island
Premiers of Prince Edward Island
Prince Edward Island Liberal Party MLAs
Prince Edward Island Liberal Party leaders